Mark Dewitt Brammer (born May 3, 1958) is a former professional American football player who played tight end in the National Football League (NFL) for five seasons for the Buffalo Bills. He is #60 on the list of Michigan's Greatest High School Football Players.

References

1958 births
Living people
American football tight ends
Buffalo Bills players
Michigan State Spartans football players
Players of American football from Michigan
Sportspeople from Traverse City, Michigan